Visoka Maala is a village in the municipality of Vasilevo, North Macedonia.

Demographics
According to the 2002 census, the village had a total of 497 inhabitants. Ethnic groups in the village include:

Turks 495
Others 2

References

Villages in Vasilevo Municipality
Turkish communities in North Macedonia